John Christopher "Kit" Lawlor (born 3 December 1922 in Dublin – died 8 June 2004) was an Irish professional footballer.

His League of Ireland playing career began with Shamrock Rovers. After spending just one season at Glenmalure Park, Lawlor moved to Drumcondra and in only his second campaign with the club, he helped them to the league championship. He was then signed by Peter Doherty for Doncaster Rovers in June 1950, playing five full seasons for them in the old Second Division, scoring 46 goals in 128 appearances.

After almost five years in England he returned home to sign for Ballymena United in December 1954. Dublin to resume his career with Drumcondra. In 1957, Lawlor was part of the Drumcondra side that caused a major shock by defeating Shamrock Rovers in the Cup final and the following year, the club won the league title. He finished his career with Dundalk moving there in 1959 at the age of 37.

He won three full Irish caps. His son Mick Lawlor also played for his country in the 1970s and is now kit manager for Ireland. Both Mick and another son Robbie also played for Rovers.

Honours
League of Ireland
  Drumcondra F.C. 1947–48, 1948–49, 1957–58: 3
FAI Cup
  Drumcondra F.C. 1957
League of Ireland Shield
  Drumcondra F.C. 1946–47

References

Sources
 The Hoops by Paul Doolan and Robert Goggins

1922 births
2004 deaths
Association footballers from County Dublin
Republic of Ireland association footballers
Ireland (FAI) international footballers
League of Ireland XI players
Shamrock Rovers F.C. players
Drumcondra F.C. players
Doncaster Rovers F.C. players
Ballymena United F.C. players
League of Ireland players
Dundalk F.C. players
NIFL Premiership players
Association football forwards